"Nergens zonder jou" (English: "Nowhere Without You") is a song recorded by Dutch artists Guus Meeuwis and Gers Pardoel. It was released on 4 November 2011 through Universal Music Group. The song was written by Guus Meeuwis, Jan Willem Rozenboom and Jan Willem Roy and was produced by Rob van Donselaar and Rozenboom. At first, "Nergens zonder jou" was recorded only by Guus Meeuwis, for his eighth studio album Armen open, without rap vocals by Gers Pardoel. Later, the artists decided to collaborate and the song including Gers Pardoel's rap was released as a digital download.

Track listing
Digital download
"Nergens zonder jou" – 3:50

Charts and certifications

Weekly charts

Year-end charts

Release history

References

2011 songs